Oxford United F.C. season 2010–11 marked the club's return to League Two after a four-year absence. Oxford United finished 12th in the division, having achieved promotion from the Football Conference via the playoffs the previous season. It was the club's 117th year in existence, their 111th of competitive football and their 62nd since turning professional. This article covers the period from 1 July 2010 to 30 June 2011.

United's first season back in the League began with a 1–1 draw at Burton Albion, and their first League win came in their 5th game, a 4–0 defeat of Morecambe. However, this convincing victory was one of only 4 wins in their initial 17 matches, and the team had dropped to 21st in the table by late November. A turnaround in fortunes saw them win 9 of the next 15 games, more-or-less guaranteeing safety from relegation and prompting hopes of a playoff place. However, a return to early-season form from the end of February onwards resulted in a mid-table position at the end of the season.

Oxford were eliminated from the FA Cup by fellow League Two side Burton Albion, but achieved an eye-catching 6–1 victory over Bristol Rovers of League One in the first round of the League Cup, before bowing out to a late goal that gave Premier League outfit West Ham a narrow home victory in the second round. They won the Oxfordshire Senior Cup for the third year running. James Constable was the club's leading scorer, also for the third season running, with 17 goals (which was to be his highest tally for Oxford outside the Football Conference).

Team kit
This season's team kit supplier was the American brand Nike, via JustSport, this season being the second in a three-year deal.
The club's main sponsor for the 2010–11 season was Bridle Insurance, an Oxfordshire-based insurance company who replaced Buildbase, who had sponsored Oxford United for a decade.

Match fixtures & results

Legend

Friendlies

Football League Two
For information on this season's Football League Two, see 2010–11 Football League Two. Oxford United's home games are played at the Kassam Stadium.

Results summary

Results by round

League table

FA Cup

League Cup

Football League Trophy

Oxfordshire Senior Cup

Player details
As of 9 May 2011 (does not include Oxfordshire Senior Cup matches or friendlies).

Awards

Transfer

In

Out

Loan in

Loan out

See also
2010–11 in English football
2010–11 Football League Two

References
General
Oxford United F.C. Official Website

Specific

External links
 Oxford United F.C. Official Website
 Oxford Mail

Oxford United F.C. seasons
Oxford United